KNYO-LP is a low-power FM (LPFM) radio station broadcasting at 107.7 FM located in Fort Bragg, California.  KNYO is a project of the Noyo Radio Project, a non-profit educational public-benefit corporation.

History
The Noyo Radio Project was incorporated in October 2000.  KNYO-LP received its Construction Permit from the FCC on February 14, 2005, and began broadcasting 24 hours per day, 7 days per week on May 7, 2006, at 107.7 FM.

The station's transmitting antenna was originally mounted at the 22 meter (72-foot) level of a 24 meter (80-foot) pine tree, which fell on January 4, 2023.

See also
List of community radio stations in the United States

References

External links
 

NYO-LP
NYO-LP
Community radio stations in the United States